James McQuade (born 14 October 1933) was a Scottish footballer who played for Dumbarton and Halifax Town.

References

1933 births
Living people
Scottish footballers
Dumbarton F.C. players
FC Halifax Town players
Scottish Football League players
Association football forwards